Quzluy-e Afshar (also Romanized as Qūzlūy-e Afshār; also known as Qowzlū-ye Afshār, Qozlū-Ye-Afshār, and Qūzlū-ye Afshār) is a village in Safa Khaneh Rural District of the Central District of Shahin Dezh County, West Azerbaijan province, Iran. At the 2006 National Census, its population was 1,757 in 336 households. The following census in 2011 counted 1,731 people in 367 households. The latest census in 2016 showed a population of 1,411 people in 432 households; it was the largest village in its rural district.

References 

Shahin Dezh County

Populated places in West Azerbaijan Province

Populated places in Shahin Dezh County